

List of Ambassadors

Jonathan Peled (Non-Resident, Mexico City) 2015 - 
Rodica Radian-Gordon (Non-Resident, Mexico City) 2010 - 2015
Ephraim Evron (Non-Resident, Washington, D.C.) 1978 - 1982
Simcha Dinitz (Non-Resident, Washington, D.C.) 1973 - 1978

References

Bahamas
Israel